Holocentridae is a family of ray-finned fish, the only family of the order Holocentriformes. The members of the subfamily Holocentrinae are typically known as squirrelfish, while the members of Myripristinae typically are known as soldierfish. In Hawaii, they are known by the Japanese name mempachi/menpachi (メンパチ) or the Hawaiian ʻūʻū.

They are found in tropical parts of the Indian, Pacific and Atlantic Oceans, with the greatest species richness near reefs in the Indo-Pacific. Being largely or entirely nocturnal, they have relatively large eyes. During the day, they typically remain hidden in crevices, caves, or under ledges. Red and silvery colours dominate. The preopercle spines (near the gill opening) of the members of the subfamily Holocentrinae are venomous, and can give painful wounds. The squirrelfishes mainly feed on small fishes and benthic invertebrates, while the soldierfishes typically feed on zooplankton. The larvae are pelagic, unlike the adults, and can be found far out to sea.

Timeline 
Definitive holocentroid fishes first appear in the earliest part of the Cenozoic and boast a modest fossil record.

References

External links
 

 
Fish of Hawaii
Ray-finned fish families
Taxa named by John Richardson (naturalist)